Aleksi Lehikoinen (born November 22, 1993), better known by his stage name Gettomasa, is a Finnish rapper. He won the Finnish battle rap championship in 2012. He released his debut album Vellamo LP in 2014 with Finnish music producer Ruuben. His first solo project Chosen One was released in 2016.

Personal life 
Lehikoinen was born in Montreal, Canada in 1993 to Finnish parents. He moved to Finland as a child, and spent most of his childhood in the Kortepohja district of Jyväskylä. He has been very open about his troubled childhood and growing up with his abusive alcoholic father. He discussed their problematic father-son relationship on the track Pelkuri (The Coward)

Lehikoinen was six years old when he was introduced to rap music by his cousin. 

Lehikoinen is a high school dropout but graduated from a vocational school.

Discography

Albums 
 Vellamo LP (2014) with Ruuben
 Chosen One (2016)
 Diplomaatti (2019)
 Kalamies (2020)
 Vastustamaton (2022)

EPs 
 Vaatekaappi EP (2012) with Ruuben
 Sessari EP (2012) with Rekami
 17 EP (2017)

References 

1993 births
Finnish rappers
Living people